Jaime Benito Fuster Berlingeri (January 12, 1941 – December 3, 2007) was a politician who served as an Associate Justice to the Supreme Court of Puerto Rico. Justice Fuster, along with Justice Liana Fiol Matta, was considered the leading liberal voice in the Puerto Rico Supreme Court.

Education
He obtained his Bachelor's Degree from the University of Notre Dame in 1962 and his Law Degree form the University of Puerto Rico in 1965. He later obtained a Master's Degree in Law from Columbia Law School in 1966. He then received a fellowship in law and humanities at Harvard University. In 1985, he received a Doctorate, Honoris Causa, from Temple University.

Political career
In 1979, Fuster was named Deputy Assistant Attorney General of the United States. He held that position until 1981. In 1984, he was elected Resident Commissioner of Puerto Rico to the United States Congress. During his tenure (1985–1992), he served a term as Chair of Congressional Hispanic Caucus.  In both terms, he served on the Committee on Banking, Finance, and Urban Affairs, and on the Committee on Interior and Insular Affairs. In Congress, he was a strong advocate for educational and youth programs. He supported numerous laws and bills to give state and local governments assistance for youth service projects and programs aimed at preventing substance use. He also supported the establishment of a Children, Youth, and Families Administration, as well as the establishment of a federal child care program. He sponsored legislation to increase social security funds for families with blind, aged, and disabled dependents.

In 1992, Governor Rafael Hernández Colón appointed him to the Supreme Court of Puerto Rico. Fuster resigned from his Resident Commissioner position on March 4, 1992 to take an appointment as associate justice of the Supreme Court of Puerto Rico.  He took the oath of office on March 4, 1992 after confirmation by the Senate, serving on the Court until his death.

Fuster was affiliated with the Popular Democratic Party of Puerto Rico and the Democratic Party of the United States.

Death
Fuster died during the early hours of December 3, 2007 from cardiac arrest. He was buried at Buxeda Memorial Park Cemetery in San Juan, Puerto Rico. His death left the Supreme Court in an unprecedented position with two seats vacant.

See also

 List of Puerto Ricans
 List of Hispanic Americans in the United States Congress
 Corsican immigration to Puerto Rico
 Federico Hernández Denton, Chief Justice of the Puerto Rico Supreme Court
 Francisco Rebollo, Associate Justice of the Puerto Rico Supreme Court
 Liana Fiol Matta, Associate Justice of the Puerto Rico Supreme Court

References

External links

 Hispanic Americans in Congress: Jaime Fuster
 Supreme Court of Puerto Rico: "Conservative and Slow" (Conservador y lento) - Primera Hora; Oscar J. Serrano; April 2, 2007 

|-

|-

|-

1941 births
2007 deaths
20th-century American judges
20th-century American politicians
Associate Justices of the Supreme Court of Puerto Rico
Columbia Law School alumni
Democratic Party members of the United States House of Representatives from Puerto Rico
Harvard University alumni
Deans of law schools in the United States
People from Guayama, Puerto Rico
Popular Democratic Party (Puerto Rico) politicians
Puerto Rican people of Catalan descent
Puerto Rican people of Corsican descent
Resident Commissioners of Puerto Rico
University of Notre Dame alumni
University of Puerto Rico alumni
American people of Italian descent
20th-century American academics